This is a list of post towns in the United Kingdom and Crown Dependencies, sorted by the postcode area (the first part of the outward code of a postcode). For more information, see the post town article.

Footnotes

References
 
 

Post towns, List
Post
Postcodes in the United Kingdom